Thelypodium is a genus of flowering plants in the mustard family. There are 16 to 20 species, all native to western North America. Thelypody is a common name for plants in this genus.

Species include:
Thelypodium brachycarpum - shortpod thelypody
Thelypodium crispum - crisped thelypody
Thelypodium eucosmum - world thelypody
Thelypodium flexuosum - nodding thelypody
Thelypodium howellii - Howell's thelypody
Thelypodium integrifolium - entireleaved thelypody
Thelypodium laciniatum - cutleaf thelypody
Thelypodium laxiflorum - droopflower thelypody
Thelypodium milleflorum - manyflower thelypody
Thelypodium paniculatum - northwestern thelypody
Thelypodium repandum - wavyleaf thelypody
Thelypodium rollinsii - Rollins' thelypody
Thelypodium sagittatum - arrow thelypody
Thelypodium stenopetalum - slenderpetal thelypody (endangered)
Thelypodium tenue - Big Bend thelypody
Thelypodium texanum - Texas thelypody
Thelypodium wrightii - Wright's thelypody

References

 
Brassicaceae genera